The enzyme aristolochene synthase (EC 4.2.3.9) catalyzes the chemical reaction

This enzyme belongs to the family of lyases, specifically those carbon-oxygen lyases acting on phosphates.  The systematic name of this enzyme class is (2E,6E)-farnesyl-diphosphate diphosphate-lyase (cyclizing, aristolochene-forming). Other names in common use include sesquiterpene cyclase, trans,trans-farnesyl diphosphate aristolochene-lyase, ''trans,trans''-farnesyl-diphosphate diphosphate-lyase (cyclizing and aristolochene-forming).  This enzyme participates in terpenoid biosynthesis.

This protein may use the morpheein model of allosteric regulation.

Structural studies

They are both notable for the very high helix content of the structure.

References

 
 
 
 
 

EC 4.2.3
Enzymes of known structure